Renato Izzo (15 June 1929 – 30 July 2009) was an Italian actor, voice actor and screenwriter.

Biography
Born in Campobasso to Romolo and Giuseppina Izzo and the second of eight children, Izzo was considered to be among the most popular and influential actors and dubbers across Italy. He founded the dubbing society Pumais Due (formerly Gruppo Trenta) in 1980 and he helped other important dubbers achieve fame such as Massimo Lodolo, Tonino Accolla, Perla Liberatori, Claudia Catani and Paolo Buglioni. He also incorporated his children and grandchildren into his ventures.

Izzo was known for dubbing actors such as Robert Hoffmann, Paul Newman, Tomas Milian, Mark Damon and Clint Eastwood. He was also renowned for his direction of the Italian dubbed versions of Apocalypse Now and Taxi Driver.

Personal life
Renato Izzo had a daughters who are all voice actresses, Simona Izzo.

Death
Izzo died in Rome on 30 July 2009, following a stroke, at the age of 80.

Filmography

Cinema
Altair (1955)
Wives and Obscurities (1956)
Il cavaliere dai cento volti (1960)
Tiger of the Seven Seas (1962)
Obiettivo ragazze (1963)
The Hours of Love (1963)
Excellent Cadavers (1999)

References

External links

1929 births
2009 deaths
People from Campobasso
Italian male film actors
Italian male voice actors
Italian male television actors
Italian male screenwriters
Italian film producers
Italian voice directors
20th-century Italian male actors
20th-century Italian screenwriters
People of Campanian descent
20th-century Italian male writers